This is a list of the aircraft types flown by Captain Eric "Winkle" Brown, RN. The list was compiled and verified by the Guinness Book of Records.

The list includes only the main aircraft types, for example, Brown flew fourteen (14) different marks of Spitfire, but only the basic types are listed here.

A
 Aeronca Grasshopper
 Aerospatiale Alouette
 Aerospatiale Ecureuil
 Aerospatiale Twin Squirrel
 Agusta 109
 Aichi D3A
 Airspeed Ambassador
 Airspeed Envoy
 Airspeed Horsa
 Airspeed Oxford
 Arado Ar 96B
 Arado Ar 196A
 Arado Ar 199
 Arado Ar 232B 
 Arado Ar 234B - Blitz
 Arado Ar 240
 Armstrong Whitworth Albemarle
 Armstrong Whitworth Whitley
 Auster Aiglet
 Avro Anson
 Avro Athena
 Avro Lancaster
 Avro Lancastrian
 Avro Lincoln
 Avro Manchester
 Avro Shackleton
 Avro Tudor
 Avro Tutor
 Avro York

B
 British Aircraft Swallow
 British Aerospace BAe 125
 British Aerospace BAe 146
 British Aerospace BAe Hawk
 Baynes Carrier Wing
 Beagle B.206
 Beagle Pup
 Beechcraft Baron
 Beechcraft Bonanza
 Beechcraft Super King Air
 Beechcraft Traveller
 Beechcraft Expediter
 Bell AH-1 Huey
 Bell 47
 Bell 204
 Bell 222
 Bell Airacobra
 Bell Airacomet
 Bell HTL-5
 Bell Jet Ranger
 Bell King Cobra
 Bell Long Ranger
 Blackburn Beverley
 Blackburn Botha
 Blackburn/HSA Buccaneer
 Blackburn Firebrand
 Blackburn Firecrest
 Blackburn Roc
 Blackburn Shark
 Blackburn Skua
 Blohm & Voss 138
 Blohm & Voss 141B
 Blohm & Voss 222 Wiking
 Boeing Washington
 Boeing Fortress
 Boeing Vertol Chinook
 Boulton Paul Defiant
 Boulton Paul P.108
 Boulton Paul Sea Balliol
 Brantly B-2
 Breguet Alizé
 Breguet Atlantic
 Brewster Buffalo
 Bristol Beaufighter
 Bristol Beaufort
 Bristol Blenheim
 Bristol Bombay
 Bristol Brigand
 Bristol Britannia
 Bristol Buckingham
 Bristol Bulldog
 Bristol Freighter
 Bristol Sycamore
 Britten-Norman Islander
 Bücker Bü 181 Bestmann
 Bücker Bü 131 Jungmann
 Bücker Bü 133 Jungmeister
 Bücker Bü 180 Student

C
 CANT Z.1007
 Caproni Ca.309
 Caproni Ca.311
 Caproni Ca.135
 Cessna 150
 Cessna 177 Cardinal
 Cessna Skymaster
 Cessna Skywagon - model not mentioned
 Chance-Vought F7U Cutlass
 Chilton D.W.1
 Chrislea Ace
 Comper Swift
 Consolidated Catalina
 Consolidated Liberator
 Consolidated PB4Y-2 Privateer
 Convair CV-240-5
 Curtiss Commando
 Curtiss Helldiver  
 Curtiss Kittyhawk
 Curtiss Mohawk
 Curtiss Seamew
 Curtiss Tomahawk

D
 Dassault Étendard - Mark not mentioned
 Dassault Mirage
 Dassault Mystère
 de Havilland 86B
 de Havilland Canada DHC-1 Chipmunk
 de Havilland Canada DHC-2 Beaver
 de Havilland Canada DHC-3 Otter
 de Havilland Comet
 de Havilland Devon
 de Havilland Don
 de Havilland Flamingo
 de Havilland Fox Moth
 de Havilland Gipsy Moth
 de Havilland Heron
 de Havilland Hornet Moth
 de Havilland Mosquito
 de Havilland Puss Moth
 de Havilland Dragon Rapide
 de Havilland Sea Hornet
 de Havilland Sea Mosquito
 de Havilland Sea Vampire
 de Havilland Sea Venom
 de Havilland Sea Vixen  
 de Havilland Swallow
 de Havilland Tiger Moth
 de Havilland Vampire
 Dewoitine D.520
 DFS 230
 DFS Kranich
 DFS Weihe
 Dornier Do 17
 Dornier Do 18
 Dornier Do 24
 Dornier Do 26
 Dornier Do 27
 Dornier Do 217
 Dornier Do 335 Pfeil
 Douglas Boston
 Douglas Dakota
 Douglas SBD Dauntless
 Douglas TBD Devastator
 Douglas A-26 Invader
 Douglas Skymaster
 Douglas F3D Skyknight  
 Douglas Skyraider
 Druine Turbulent

E
 Elliotts Newbury Eon
 Embraer EMB 110 Bandeirante
 English Electric Canberra
 English Electric Lightning
 Enstrom F-28
 Enstrom Shark
 ERCO Ercoupe

F
 Fairchild Argus
 Fairchild Cornell
 Fairchild XNQ-1
 Fairey III.F
 Fairey Albacore
 Fairey Barracuda  
 Fairey Battle
 Fairey Firefly
 Fairey Fulmar
 Fairey Gannet
 Fairey Gordon
 Fairey Primer
 Fairey Spearfish
 Fairey Swordfish
 Fiat BR.20 Cicogna
 Fiat CR.32
 Fiat CR.42
 Fiat G.50 Freccia
 Fieseler Fi 156 Storch 
 Focke-Wulf Fw 189 Uhu
 Focke-Wulf Fw 190
 Focke-Wulf Fw 200 Condor
 Focke-Wulf Fw 58 Weihe
 Focke-Wulf Ta 152
 Focke-Wulf Ta 154 - Moskito
 Folland 43/37
 Fouga Magister
 Fournier Milan

G
 General Aircraft Cygnet
 General Aircraft Hamilcar
 General Aircraft Hotspur
 General Aircraft GAL.56
 Gloster E.28/39
 Gloster Gauntlet
 Gloster Gladiator
 Gloster Javelin
 Gloster Meteor
 Gloster Sea Meteor
 Gotha Go 244
 Grumman Ag Cat
 Grumman Albatross
 Grumman Avenger
 Grumman F8F Bearcat
 Grumman F9F Cougar
 Grumman Goose
 Grumman AF Guardian  
 Grumman Hellcat
 Grumman F9F Panther  
 Grumman F7F Tigercat
 Grumman Widgeon
 Grumman Wildcat

H
 Handley Page Gugnunc
 Handley Page Halifax
 Handley Page Hampden
 Handley Page Hastings
 Handley Page Hermes
 Handley Page Marathon
 Handley Page Sparrow
 Hawker Fury (biplane)
 Hawker Hart
 Hawker Hector
 Hawker Henley
 Hawker Hunter
 Hawker Hurricane
 Hawker Nimrod
 Hawker Osprey
 Hawker P.1040
 Hawker P.1052
 Hawker Siddeley P.1127 - Harrier forerunner
 Hawker Sea Fury
 Hawker Sea Hawk
 Hawker Siddeley HS 748
 Hawker Siddeley Gnat
 Hawker Tempest
 Hawker Typhoon
 Heinkel He 111
 Heinkel He 115
 Heinkel He 162 Spatz
 Heinkel He 177 Greif
 Heinkel He 219 Uhu
 Henschel Hs 123
 Henschel Hs 129
 Heston Phoenix
 Hiller HTE
 Hitachi T.2
 Horten H.IV
 Hughes 300
 Hughes 500
 Hunting Percival Jet Provost
 Hunting Percival Provost

I
 Ilyushin Il-2 Shturmovik 
 Ilyushin Il-4

J
 Jodel Ambassadeur
 Jodel Club
 Jodel Excellence - effectively the same aircraft as the Ambassadeur
 Jodel Grand Tourisme - effectively the same aircraft as the Mascaret
 Jodel Mascaret
 Jodel Mousqetaire
 Junkers Ju 52
 Junkers Ju 86
 Junkers Ju 87 Stuka
 Junkers Ju 188
 Junkers Ju 290
 Junkers Ju 352
 Junkers Ju 388

K
 Kamov Ka-26
 Kawasaki Ki-61 Hien/Tony
 Klemm Kl 25
 Klemm Kl 26
 Klemm Kl 27
 Klemm Kl 35D

L
 Lavochkin La-7
 Le Vier Cosmic Wind
 Ling-Temco-Vought F-8 Crusader
 Lockheed Constellation
 Lockheed Electra - Model not mentioned
 Lockheed C-130 Hercules
 Lockheed Hudson
 Lockheed P-38 Lightning
 Lockheed P2V Neptune
 Lockheed P-80 Shooting Star
 Lockheed F-104 Starfighter
 Lockheed Ventura
 Luton Minor

M
 Macchi C.202
 Macchi C.205
 Martin-Baker MB 5 
 Martin Baltimore
 Martin Marauder
 MBB Bo 105
 McDonnell F2H Banshee
 McDonnell Douglas A-4 Skyhawk
 McDonnell Douglas F-4 Phantom II (F4-K and FGA-1 Variants)  
 Messerschmitt Bf 108 Taifun
 Messerschmitt Bf 109
 Messerschmitt Bf 110
 Messerschmitt Me 163A & B Komet - Me 163B flown under power
 Messerschmitt Me 262
 Messerschmitt Me 410 Hornisse 
 Mikoyan-Gurevich MiG-3
 Mikoyan-Gurevich MiG-15
 Mil Mi-1
 Mil Mi-2
 Mil Mi-4
 Miles M.18
 Miles M.20
 Miles M.28
 Miles M.38 Messenger
 Miles M.48
 Miles Aerovan
 Miles Falcon
 Miles Gemini
 Miles Hawk
 Miles Hobby
 Miles Libellula
 Miles Magister
 Miles Martinet
 Miles Master
 Miles Mentor
 Miles Mohawk
 Miles Monarch
 Miles Monitor
 Miles Sparrowhawk
 Mitsubishi G4M (Betty)
 Mitsubishi Ki-46 (Dinah)
 Mitsubishi A6M (Zero or Zeke) 
 Mooney M20
 Morane-Saulnier M.S.406
 Morane-Saulnier Paris
 Morane-Saulnier Rallye
 Muntz Youngman-Baynes

N
 N.S.F.K. SG 38
 Nakajima Ki-84 Hayate (Frank)
 Nakajima Ki-43 Hayabusa (Oscar)
 Noorduyn Norseman
 Nord N.262A
 Nord Noralpha
 Nord Pingouin
 North American Harvard
 North American Mitchell
 North American Mustang
 North American Sabre(& FJ-2 Fury Naval Version) 
 North American AJ Savage
 North American F-100 Super Sabre
 North American T-6 Texan
 Northrop Gamma Commercial
 Northrop P-61 Black Widow
 Northrop F-5

O
 Orličan L-40 Meta Sokol

P
 Percival Gull
 Percival Pembroke
 Percival Prentice
 Percival Proctor
 Percival Q6
 Percival Vega Gull
 Petlyakov Pe-2
 Piaggio P.136
 Piaggio P.166
 Piasecki Retriever
 Piel Emeraude
 Pilatus Porter
 Piper Apache
 Piper Aztec
 Piper Comanche
 Piper Cub
 Piper Cub Special 90
 Piper Grasshopper
 Piper Navajo
 Piper Pawnee
 Piper Seneca
 Piper Supercruiser
 Piper Tripacer
 Piper Cherokee
 Pitts Special
 Polikarpov I-15
 Polikarpov I-16
 Portsmouth Aerocar Major

R
 Reggiane Re.2000
 Reggiane Re.2001
 Reid & Sigrist Desford
 Republic Seabee
 Republic P-43 Lancer
 Republic Thunderbolt
 Republic F-84 Thunderjet
 Republic F-84F Thunderstreak
 Robin Royale
 Robinson R22
 Rollason Condor
 Ryan Fireball

S
 Saab 21
 Saab 29 Tunnan
 Saab 32 Lansen
 Saab 91 Safir
 Saab 105
 Saro P.531
 Saunders-Roe Skeeter
 Saunders-Roe SR.A/1
 Savoia-Marchetti SM.79 - Sparviero
 Savoia-Marchetti SM.82
 Savoia-Marchetti SM.95
 Scheibe Motorspatz
 Schmetz Olympia-Meise
 Schneider Baby Grunau
 Scottish Aviation Bulldog
 Scottish Aviation Pioneer
 Scottish Aviation Twin Pioneer
 Short S.31 - ½-scale flying test version of Stirling 
 Short Sealand
 Short SC.7 Skyvan
 Short Stirling
 Short Sturgeon
 SIAI-Marchetti S.F.260
 Siebel Si 204
 Sikorsky HRS
 Sikorsky R-4B Hoverfly - first helicopter flown by Brown, learned to fly it from aircraft manual.
 Sikorsky R-6A Hoverfly II
 Sikorsky S-58T
 Sikorsky S-61
 Sikorsky S-76
 Sipa S.903
 Slingsby Capstan
 Slingsby Kirby Cadet
 Slingsby Motor Tutor
 Slingsby Prefect
 Slingsby Swallow
 Slingsby T.21
 Slingsby T.31
 Socata Diplomate
 Stampe et Vertongen SV.4
 Stearman Kaydet
 Stinson Junior R
 Stinson Reliant
 Stinson Sentinel
 Sud-Aviation Djinn
 Supermarine Attacker
 Supermarine S.24/37 Dumbo
 Supermarine Scimitar
 Supermarine Sea Otter
 Supermarine Seafang
 Supermarine Seafire  
 Supermarine Seagull
 Supermarine Spiteful
 Supermarine Spitfire
 Supermarine Walrus
 SZD Bocian

T
 Taylorcraft Auster
 Taylor J.T.1 Monoplane
 Taylor J.T.2 Titch
 Thruxton Jackaroo
 Tipsy Nipper III
 Tipsy S.2
 Tipsy Trainer
 Tipsy Type B

V
 Vertol 107
 Vickers Valiant
 Vickers Vanguard
 Vickers VC10
 Vickers Viking (airliner)
 Vickers Viscount
 Vickers Warwick
 Vickers Wellington VI
 Vickers Windsor
 Vought F4U Corsair
 Vought-Sikorsky Chesapeake  
 Vought-Sikorsky Kingfisher
 Vultee Vengeance

W
 Waco CG-3
 Waco Hadrian
 Westland Aérospatiale Gazelle
 Westland Aerospatiale Lynx
 Westland Lysander
 Westland Sikorsky Dragonfly
 Westland Sikorsky Whirlwind (helicopter)
 Westland Wasp
 Westland Welkin
 Westland Wessex
 Westland Whirlwind (fighter)
 Westland Wyvern (Eagle engine) 
 Winter Zaunkönig - Wren

Y
 Yakovlev Yak-1
 Yakovlev Yak-9
 Yakovlev Yak-11
 Youngman-Baynes High Lift

Z
 Zlin Akrobat

Notes

References 
 
 
 
 

Brown
Bro
Bro